Shuangjiang Road is a Shanghai Metro station located on Line 10 in Pudong, Shanghai. Located at the intersection of Shuangjiang Road and Gangcheng Road, it was expected to open with the rest of the northern extension of Line 10 in 2018, however, due to construction delays, it opened on 26 December 2020.

Description 
The station is in the northern part of Pudong, at the intersection of Gangcheng Road and Shuangjiang Road. It is one of five stations on Line 10 in Pudong, and the first station to be located in the district heading toward  station. It is an elevated structure consisting of 2 side platforms.

References 

Railway stations in Shanghai
Shanghai Metro stations in Pudong
Line 10, Shanghai Metro
Railway stations in China opened in 2020